The 2002 IAAF World Race Walking Cup was held on 12 and 13 October 2002 in the streets of Turin, Italy.
Detailed reports on the event and an appraisal of the results was given for the IAAF.

Complete results were published.

Medallists

Results

Men's 20 km

Team (20 km Men)

Men's 50 km

Team (50 km Men)

Women's 20 km

Team (20km Women)

Participation
The participation of 298 athletes (203 men/95 women) from 51 countries is reported.

 (5/1)
 (8/4)
 (-/2)
 (1/1)
 (4/2)
 (1/-)
 (10/5)
 (1/-)
 (1/-)
 (5/1)
 (1/-)
 (4/-)
 (-/1)
 (2/3)
 (3/-)
 (1/1)
 (9/4)
 (8/4)
 (8/-)
 (3/2)
 (3/1)
 (6/3)
 (3/-)
 (3/2)
 (9/5)
 (4/-)
 (2/2)
 (4/-)
 (4/2)
 (10/4)
 (2/-)
 (-/1)
 (3/3)
 (5/1)
 (6/4)
 (7/5)
 (1/-)
 (-/4)
 (10/5)
 (8/1)
 (1/-)
 (8/5)
 (3/1)
 (4/2)
 (1/-)
 (1/-)
 (-/3)
 (4/3)
 (10/5)
 (-/1)
 Yugoslavia (3/-)

See also
 2002 Race Walking Year Ranking

References

External links
Official IAAF website for the 2002 IAAF World Race Walking Cup
Results - IAAF.org

World Athletics Race Walking Team Championships
World Race Walking Cup
World Race Walking Cup
World Race Walking Cup